The men's individual competition at the Biathlon World Championships 2007 was held on 6 February 2007.

Results
The race was started at 14:15.

References

Men's Individual